Rama Narayanan (3 April 1949 – 22 June 2014) was an Indian film director and producer. In the 1980s, he was known as a director who specialized in shooting commercial films in which animals played vital roles, while in the 1990s, several of his films were based on Hindu devotional subjects. He has also headed the Tamil Film Producers Council (TFPC) for three consecutive elections, before resigning in 2011. He died on 22 June 2014 at a Singapore hospital due to kidney-related ailments.

Career
Narayanan came to Chennai intending to become a songwriter, but he became a dialogue writer for films. He and his friend M. A. Khaja started to write dialogues together under the pen name Ram-Rahim.

In 1976, Narayanan wrote his first story, screenplay and dialogue for the film Aasai Arubadhu Naal. He produced his first film Meenakshi Kungumam in 1977 and directed his first film Sumai in 1981. He also wrote the script for Chiranjeevi's film Punnami Naagu. His 50th film was Veeran Veluthambi, for which M. Karunanidhi wrote the story and dialogue. His 100th film was Thirupathi Ezhumalai Venkatesa.

In the 2010s, he finished the making of a comedy film titled Siva Poojaiyil Karadi with Shiva and Udhayathara starring, but the film did not have a theatrical release.

Narayanan was an MLA from the Karaikudi constituency in 1989 and the chairman of Iyal Isai Nataka Mandram in 1996. He has received the Kalaimamani award of the State Government.

Filmography

As director

As producer 
 Meenakshi Kungumam (under Sri Devipriya Films)
 Velum Mayilum Thunai (under Sri Devipriya Films)
 Oru Vidukadhai Oru Thodarkadhai (under Sri Devipriya Films)
Naagam
Kazhugumalai Kallan
Pudhupatti Ponnuthaayi
 Koundar Veettu Mappillai (under Sri Devipriya Films)
 Kanna Laddu Thinna Aasaiya (under Sri Thenandal Films)

As writer only 
 Aasai Arubathu Naal (Story/dialogue) (As Ram-Rahim)
 Durgadevi (Story/dialogue) (As Ram-Rahim)
 Raghupathi Raghavan Rajaram (Story/dialogue) (As Ram-Rahim)
 Manthoppu Kiliye (Story/dialogue) (As Ram-Rahim)
 Theru Vilakku (Story/dialogue) (As Ram-Rahim)
 Thenpandi Seemaiyile (Story/dialogue)
 Punnami Naagu
Manaivi Oru Manickam

References

External links
 
 Rama Narayanan at Cinesouth
 Rama Narayanan Profile and Biography at Veethi

1949 births
Tamil film directors
Kannada film directors
2014 deaths
Film directors from Chennai
20th-century Indian film directors
21st-century Indian film directors
Tamil film producers
Film producers from Chennai
Telugu film directors
Screenwriters from Chennai
People from Sivaganga district